Foxleigh may refer to:

Foxleigh coal mine in Queensland, Australia 
Foxleigh, Florida, an unincorporated area in Florida